In probability theory and statistics, the inverse gamma distribution is a two-parameter family of continuous probability distributions on the positive real line, which is the distribution of the reciprocal of a variable distributed according to the gamma distribution.  

Perhaps the chief use of the inverse gamma distribution is in Bayesian statistics, where the distribution arises as the marginal posterior distribution for the unknown variance of a normal distribution, if an uninformative prior is used, and as an analytically tractable conjugate prior, if an informative prior is required. It is common among some Bayesians to consider an alternative parametrization of the normal distribution in terms of the precision, defined as the reciprocal of the variance, which allows the gamma distribution to be used directly as a conjugate prior.  Other Bayesians prefer to parametrize the inverse gamma distribution differently, as a scaled inverse chi-squared distribution.

Characterization

Probability density function
The inverse gamma distribution's probability density function is defined over the support 

with shape parameter  and  scale parameter .  Here  denotes the gamma function.

Unlike the Gamma distribution, which contains a somewhat similar exponential term,  is a scale parameter as the distribution function satisfies:

Cumulative distribution function
The cumulative distribution function is the regularized gamma function

where the numerator is the upper incomplete gamma function and the denominator is the gamma function.

Moments
Provided that , the -th moment of the inverse gamma distribution is given by

Characteristic function
 in the expression of the characteristic function is the modified Bessel function of the 2nd kind.

Properties
 
and
 

The information entropy is

 

where   is the digamma function.

The Kullback-Leibler divergence of Inverse-Gamma(αp, βp) from Inverse-Gamma(αq, βq) is the same as the KL-divergence of Gamma(αp, βp) from Gamma(αq, βq):

Related distributions
 If  then , for 
 If  then  (inverse-chi-squared distribution)
 If  then  (scaled-inverse-chi-squared distribution)
 If  then  (Lévy distribution)
 If  then  (Exponential distribution)
 If  (Gamma distribution with rate parameter ) then  (see derivation in the next paragraph for details) 
Note that If  (Gamma distribution with scale parameter  ) then  
 Inverse gamma distribution is a special case of type 5 Pearson distribution
 A multivariate generalization of the inverse-gamma distribution is the inverse-Wishart distribution.
 For the distribution of a sum of independent inverted Gamma variables see Witkovsky (2001)

Derivation from Gamma distribution

Let , and recall that the pdf of the gamma distribution is

, .

Note that  is the rate parameter from the perspective of the gamma distribution.

Define the transformation .

Note that  is the scale parameter from the perspective of the inverse gamma distribution. This can be straightforwardly demonstrated by seeing that  satisfies the conditions for being a scale parameter.

Occurrence

See also
Gamma distribution
Inverse-chi-squared distribution
Normal distribution
  Pearson distribution

References

Hoff, P. (2009). "A first course in bayesian statistical methods". Springer.

Continuous distributions
Conjugate prior distributions
Probability distributions with non-finite variance
Exponential family distributions
Gamma and related functions